Joseph Michael Crabb (born April 3, 1983), is an American former professional ice hockey winger who played in the National Hockey League (NHL) with the Atlanta Thrashers, Toronto Maple Leafs, Washington Capitals and Florida Panthers.

Playing career
Previously, Crabb played for Colorado College of the Western Collegiate Hockey Association (WCHA), the Chicago Wolves of the American Hockey League (AHL), and the Toronto Maple Leafs and Atlanta Thrashers (NHL). He scored his first NHL goal on December 10, 2008 in a game against the New York Rangers.

On June 24, 2010, Crabb was traded by the Thrashers to the Chicago Blackhawks as part of a deal that sent the Thrashers' first (24th overall) and second round picks in the 2010 NHL Entry Draft as well as Marty Reasoner, Crabb and Jeremy Morin to Chicago in exchange for Dustin Byfuglien, Brent Sopel, Ben Eager and Akim Aliu. However, he signed a contract with the Toronto Maple Leafs on the first day of free agency, July 1, 2010. Crabb started the 2010–11 season with the Toronto Marlies of the American Hockey League but was frequently called up to the Maple Leafs, playing a total of 48 games that season.
 	
On July 2, 2012, Crabb signed a one-year contract with the Washington Capitals.

During the 2012-13 NHL lockout, Crabb played for the Alaska Aces of the ECHL, and returned to Washington at the end of the lockout.

On March 22, 2013, Crabb was placed on waivers by the Washington Capitals and assigned to play for the Hershey Bears of the American Hockey League.

On July 5, 2013 Crabb signed a two-year contract with the Florida Panthers.

Prior to the 2014–15 season, on October 6, 2014, Crabb was traded by the Panthers to the New York Rangers in exchange for Steven Kampfer and Andrew Yogan. Having passed through waivers he was assigned to AHL affiliate, the Hartford Wolf Pack for the duration of the year, contributing with 28 points in 66 games. In the post-season, Crabb elevated his play and posted 10 points in 15 games.

As a free agent from the Rangers, Crabb went unsigned over the summer, before accepting an invite to the Arizona Coyotes training camp on September 16, 2015. His stay with the Coyotes was brief as he was released upon the completion of camp on September 21. On October 7, 2015, Crabb opted to sign his first contract abroad, agreeing to a one-year deal with Swedish club, Växjö Lakers HC. In the 2015–16 season, Crabb appeared in 31 games with the Lakers before opting to transfer to fellow SHL club, Frölunda HC on February 1, 2016. He helped the Indians, to play in 14 post-season games for 7 points in claiming their fourth Le Mat Trophy in Franchise history.

At the conclusion of his 10th professional season, Crabb announced his retirement from the game. He initially joined hometown collegiate program, Alaska Anchorage Seawolves, as a volunteer assistant coach.

Career statistics

Regular season and playoffs

International

References

External links

1983 births
Living people
Alaska Aces (ECHL) players
American men's ice hockey right wingers
Atlanta Thrashers players
Chicago Wolves players
Colorado College Tigers men's ice hockey players
Florida Panthers players
Frölunda HC players
Green Bay Gamblers players
Hartford Wolf Pack players
Hershey Bears players
Ice hockey people from Anchorage, Alaska
New York Rangers draft picks
San Antonio Rampage players
Toronto Maple Leafs players
Toronto Marlies players
USA Hockey National Team Development Program players
Växjö Lakers players
Washington Capitals players